"Coming Around Again" is a song by American singer-songwriter Carly Simon, written for the film Heartburn (1986) and later from the album of the same name, Coming Around Again (1987). Released as a single in 1986, it became one of Simon's biggest hits, peaking at  18 on the US Billboard Hot 100 and No. 5 on the Billboard Adult Contemporary chart. It was also a top-10 hit in Austria, the Netherlands, Sweden, and the United Kingdom.

The success of the song began a career resurgence for Simon. It is featured on multiple compilations of her work, including the three-disc box set Clouds in My Coffee (1995), the UK import The Very Best of Carly Simon: Nobody Does It Better (1998), the two-disc retrospective Anthology (2002), the single-disc Reflections: Carly Simon's Greatest Hits (2004), and Sony Music's Playlist: The Very Best of Carly Simon (2014).

"Itsy Bitsy Spider"
A similar stripped-down arrangement of "Coming Around Again" (key of C) was used in Simon's recording of the classic children's song "Itsy Bitsy Spider" (key of G), which was the B-side of the single and also included on the Coming Around Again album.

When the song is sung as part of a medley, as it is on the 1987 album Greatest Hits Live which is the soundtrack to her HBO special Live from Martha's Vineyard, there is an extended  turnaround acting not only as a bridge between the two songs, but also as a bridge between the two keys.

Reception
"Coming Around Again" became a worldwide hit; in the US, it peaked at No. 18 on the Billboard Hot 100, becoming Simon's 12th top-40 hit on this chart, and No. 5 on the Billboard Adult Contemporary chart, becoming her 19th top-40 hit on this chart. The song was a success in Brazil, as it was included in the soundtrack of the telenovela O Outro. It was released as a single in the United Kingdom in January 1987, and reached a peak position of No. 10 on the UK Singles Chart in late February. Additionally, the song reached No. 15 in South Africa, No. 29 in Australia and No. 38 in Canada. It was most successful in Austria and Sweden, reaching No. 6 and No. 3, respectively.

Billboard said the song's "moody sway is comparable to the Thompsons' 'Hold Me Now.'"

Music video
A music video for this song was filmed and went into heavy rotation in 1987. The video featured a home movie featuring Carly Simon as a baby and as a young child with her parents.

Track listings and formats
7-inch single (worldwide)
 "Coming Around Again" – 3:31
 "Itsy Bitsy Spider" – 3:34

12-inch and CD single (UK, Germany) 
 "Coming Around Again" – 3:31
 "Itsy Bitsy Spider" – 3:34
 "If It Wasn't Love" – 4:18

Cassette EP single (US)
 "Coming Around Again/Itsy Bitsy Spider" (Live at Martha's Vineyard) – 7:04
 "Turn of the Tide" (1988 Democratic Convention Theme/Free to be a Family) – 4:04
 "Let the River Run" (Theme from Working Girl) – 3:40

Personnel

Charts

Weekly charts

Year-end charts

In popular culture
The song was featured in a 1987 episode of the US daytime soap opera General Hospital as well as a 1988 episode of The Bold and the Beautiful. It was used on the 1996–97 ITV medical drama Staying Alive with opening and end theme tunes, and it was used on the daytime serial Santa Barbara for the Mason and Julia characters. 

The song was used in an episode of Netflix's Firefly Lane, which premiered in 2021.

The song was covered by Irish girl group B*Witched in 1999, as the B-side to their single "Jesse Hold On".

Northern Irish rock band Ash covered the song in 2009, and their version is included on their A-Z Vol. 1 compilation.

References

External links
Carly Simon's Official Website

1986 songs
1986 singles
Carly Simon songs
Songs written by Carly Simon
Arista Records singles
Pop ballads
Songs written for films